Özgü is a common feminine Turkish given name. In Turkish, "Özgü" means "holly". But it also means "characteristic".

Real People

 Özgü Namal, a Turkish actress.
 Özgü Uzun, a Turkish football player at Southern Stars Football Club
 Gökçe Özgü, a Turkish rugby player at Turkey national rugby union team

Turkish feminine given names